This is a list of schools in the City of Leeds in the English county of West Yorkshire.

State-funded schools

Primary schools 

 Aberford CE Primary School, Aberford
 Adel Primary School, Adel
 Adel St John the Baptist CE Primary School, Adel
 Alder Tree Primary Academy, Potternewton
 All Saints' Richmond Hill CE Primary School, Richmond Hill
 Allerton Bywater Primary School, Allerton Bywater
 Allerton CE Primary School, Moor Allerton
 Alwoodley Primary School, Alwoodley
 Armley Park Primary School, Armley
 Ashfield Primary School, Otley
 Asquith Primary School, Morley
 Austhorpe Primary School, Austhorpe
 Bankside Primary School, Harehills
 Bardsey Primary Academy, Bardsey
 Barwick-in-Elmet CE Primary School, Barwick-in-Elmet
 Beechwood Primary School, Seacroft
 Beecroft Primary School, Burley
 Beeston Hill St Luke's CE Primary School, Beeston
 Beeston Primary School, Beeston
 Birchfield Primary School, Gildersome
 Blackgates Primary School, Tingley
 Blenheim Primary School, Blenheim
 Bracken Edge Primary School, Potternewton
 Bramham Primary School, Bramham
 Bramhope Primary School, Bramhope
 Bramley Park Academy, Bramley
 Bramley St Peter's CE Primary School, Bramley
 Broadgate Primary School, Horsforth
 Brodetsky Primary School, Moortown
 Brudenell Primary School, Hyde Park
 Burley St Matthias CE Primary School, Burley
 Calverley CE Primary School, Calverley
 Calverley Parkside Primary School, Calverley
 Carlton Primary School, Carlton
 Carr Manor Community School, Meanwood
 Castleton Primary School, New Wortley
 Chapel Allerton Primary School, Chapel Allerton
 Christ Church Upper Armley CE Primary School, Armley
 Christ The King RC Primary School, Bramley
 Churwell Primary School, Churwell
 Clapgate Primary School, Middleton
 Cobden Primary School, Farnley
 Cockburn Haigh Road Academy, Rothwell
 Collingham Lady Elizabeth Hastings' CE Primary School, Collingham
 Colton Primary School, Colton
 Cookridge Holy Trinity CE Primary School, Cookridge
 Cookridge Primary School, Cookridge
 Co-op Academy Beckfield, Tyersal
 Co-op Academy Brownhill, Harehills
 Co-op Academy Nightingale, Harehills
 Co-op Academy Oakwood, Gipton
 Co-op Academy Woodlands, Harehills
 Corpus Christi RC Primary School, Halton Moor
 Cottingley Primary Academy, Cottingley
 Cross Gates Primary School, Cross Gates
 Crossley Street Primary School, Wetherby
 Deighton Gates Primary School, Wetherby
 Dixons Trinity Chapeltown, Chapeltown
 Drighlington Primary School, Drighlington
 East Ardsley Primary Academy, East Ardsley
 East Garforth Primary Academy, East Garforth
 Ebor Gardens Primary Academy, Burmantofts
 Elements Primary School, Middleton
 Farsley Farfield Primary School, Farsley
 Farsley Springbank Primary School, Farsley
 Fieldhead Carr Primary School, Whinmoor
 Five Lanes Primary School, Wortley
 Fountain Primary School, Morley
 Gildersome Primary School, Gildersome
 Gledhow Primary School, Gledhow
 Grange Farm Primary School, Seacroft
 Great Preston CE Primary School, Great Preston
 Green Lane Primary Academy, Garforth
 Greenhill Primary School, Bramley
 Greenmount Primary School, Beeston
 Greenside Primary School, Pudsey
 Grimes Dyke Primary School, Stanks
 Guiseley Primary School, Guiseley
 Harehills Primary School, Harehills
 Harewood CE Primary School, Harewood
 Hawksworth CE Primary School, Hawksworth
 Hawksworth Wood Primary School, Hawksworth
 Highfield Primary School, Moortown
 Hill Top Primary Academy, Tingley
 Hillcrest Academy, Chapeltown
 Hollybush Primary, Bramley
 Holy Family RC Primary School, Armley
 Holy Name RC Academy, Cookridge
 Holy Rosary and St Anne's RC Primary School, Chapeltown
 Holy Trinity CE Academy, Rothwell
 Horsforth Featherbank Primary School, Horsforth
 Horsforth Newlaithes Primary School, Horsforth
 Hovingham Primary School, Harehills
 Hugh Gaitskell Primary School, Beeston
 Hunslet Carr Primary School, Hunslet
 Hunslet Moor Primary School, Hunslet
 Hunslet St Mary's Church of England Primary School
 Immaculate Heart of Mary RC Primary School, Chapel Allerton
 Ingram Road Primary School, Holbeck
 Ireland Wood Primary School, Ireland Wood
 Iveson Primary School, Tinshill
 Kerr Mackie Primary School, Roundhay
 Kippax Ash Tree Primary School, Kippax
 Kippax Greenfield Primary School, Kippax
 Kippax North Primary School, Kippax
 Kirkstall St Stephen's Church of England Primary School, Kirkstall
 Kirkstall Valley Primary School, Kirkstall
 Lady Elizabeth Hastings CE Primary School, Ledston
 Lady Elizabeth Hastings CE Primary School, Thorp Arch
 Lane End Primary School, Holbeck
 Lawns Park Primary School, Old Farnley
 Little London Community Primary School, Little London
 Low Road Primary School, Hunslet
 Lower Wortley Primary School, Wortley
 Lowtown Primary School, Pudsey
 Manor Wood Primary School, Moortown
 Manston Primary School, Manston
 Manston St James Primary Academy, Manston
 Meadowfield Primary School, Osmondthorpe
 Meanwood CE Primary School, Meanwood
 Methley Primary School, Methley
 Micklefield CE Primary School, Micklefield
 Middleton Primary School, Middleton
 Middleton St Mary's CE Primary School, Middleton
 Moor Allerton Hall Primary School, Moor Allerton
 Moortown Primary School, Moortown
 Morley Newlands Primary Academy, Morley
 Morley Victoria Primary School, Morley
 The New Bewerley Community School, Hunslet
 Ninelands Primary School, Garforth
 Otley All Saints CofE Primary School, Otley
 Otley The Whartons Primary School, Otley
 Oulton Primary School, Oulton
 Our Lady of Good Counsel RC Primary School, Seacroft
 Park Spring Primary School, Hough End
 Park View Primary Academy, Beeston
 Parklands Primary School, Seacroft
 Pool-in-Wharfedale CE Primary School, Pool-in-Wharfedale
 Primley Wood Primary School, Chapeltown
 Primrose Lane Primary School, Boston Spa
 Pudsey Bolton Royd Primary School, Pudsey
 Pudsey Primrose Hill Primary School, Pudsey
 Pudsey Waterloo Primary, Pudsey
 Quarry Mount Primary School, Woodhouse
 Queensway Primary School, Yeadon
 Rawdon Littlemoor Primary School, Rawdon
 Rawdon St Peter's CE Primary School, Rawdon
 Raynville Academy, Bramley
 The Richmond Hill Academy, Richmond Hill
 Robin Hood Primary School, Robin Hood
 Rosebank Primary School, Burley
 Rothwell Primary School, Rothwell
 Rothwell St Mary's RC Primary School, Rothwell
 Roundhay School, Roundhay
 Roundhay St John's CE Primary School, Roundhay
 Rufford Park Primary School, Yeadon
 Ryecroft Academy, Farnley
 Sacred Heart RC Primary School, Burley
 St Anthony's RC Primary School, Beeston
 St Augustine's RC Primary School, Gipton
 St Bartholomew's CE Primary School, Armley
 St Benedict's RC Primary School, Garforth
 St Chad's CE Primary School, Lawnswood
 St Edward's RC Primary School, Boston Spa
 St Francis RC Primary School, Morley
 St Francis of Assisi RC Primary School, Beeston
 St James' CE Primary School, Wetherby
 St Joseph's Catholic Primary School, Hunslet
 St Joseph's Catholic Primary School, Otley 
 St Joseph's Catholic Primary School, Pudsey
 St Joseph's Catholic Primary School, Wetherby
 St Margaret's CE Primary School, Horsforth
 St Marys CE Primary Academy, Hunslet
 St Mary's CE Primary School, Boston Spa
 St Mary's RC Primary School, Horsforth
 St Matthew's CE Primary School, Chapel Allerton 
 St Nicholas RC Primary School, Gipton
 St Oswald's CE Junior School, Guiseley
 St Patrick's RC Primary School, Burmantofts
 St Paul's RC Primary School, Whinmoor
 St Peter's CE Primary School, Lincoln Green
 St Philip's RC Primary School, Middleton
 St Theresa's RC Primary School, Manston
 St Urban's RC Primary School, Chapel Allerton
 SS Peter and Paul RC Primary School, Yeadon
 Scholes Primary School, Scholes
 Seacroft Grange Primary School, Seacroft
 Seven Hills Primary School, Morley
 Shadwell Primary School, Shadwell
 Shakespeare Primary School, Burmantofts
 Sharp Lane Primary School, Middleton
 Shire Oak CE Primary School, Headingley
 Southroyd Primary School, Pudsey
 Spring Bank Primary School, Headingley
 Stanningley Primary School, Stanningley
 Strawberry Fields Primary School, Garforth
 Summerfield Primary School, Bramley
 Swarcliffe Primary School, Swarcliffe
 Swillington Primary School, Swillington
 Swinnow Primary School, Swinnow
 Talbot Primary School, Roundhay
 Temple Learning Academy, Halton Moor
 Templenewsam Halton Primary School, Halton
 Thorner CE Primary School, Thorner
 Thorpe Primary School, Thorpe on the Hill
 Tranmere Park Primary School, Guiseley
 Valley View Community Primary School, Rodley
 Victoria Junior School, Rothwell
 Victoria Primary Academy, East End Park
 Weetwood Primary School, Weetwood
 West End Primary School, Horsforth
 Westbrook Lane Primary School, Horsforth
 Westerton Primary Academy, Tingley
 Westgate Primary School, Otley
 Westroyd Primary School, Farsley 
 Westwood Primary School, Middleton
 Whingate Primary School, Wortley
 Whinmoor St Paul's CE Primary School, Whinmoor
 White Laith Primary School, Whinmoor
 Whitecote Primary School, Bramley
 Whitkirk Primary School, Whitkirk
 Wigton Moor Primary School, Alwoodley
 Windmill Primary School, Belle Isle
 Woodlesford Primary School, Woodlesford
 Wykebeck Primary School, Harehills
 Yeadon Westfield Infant School, Yeadon
 Yeadon Westfield Junior School, Yeadon

Secondary schools 

Abbey Grange Church of England Academy, West Park
Allerton Grange School, Moortown
Allerton High School, Moor Allerton
Benton Park School, Rawdon
Bishop Young Church of England Academy, Seacroft
Boston Spa Academy, Boston Spa
Brigshaw High School, Allerton Bywater
Bruntcliffe Academy, Morley
Cardinal Heenan Catholic High School, Meanwood
Carr Manor Community School, Meanwood
Cockburn John Charles Academy, Belle Isle
Cockburn Laurence Calvert Academy, Middleton
Cockburn School, Beeston
Co-op Academy Leeds, Burmantofts
Co-op Academy Priesthorpe, Farsley
Corpus Christi Catholic College, Halton Moor
Crawshaw Academy, Pudsey
Dixons Trinity Chapeltown, Chapeltown
Dixons Unity Academy, Armley
The Farnley Academy, Farnley
Garforth Academy, Garforth
Guiseley School, Guiseley
Horsforth School, Horsforth
John Smeaton Academy, Cross Gates
Lawnswood School, West Park
Leeds City Academy, Woodhouse
Leeds East Academy, Seacroft
Leeds Jewish Free School, Alwoodley
Leeds West Academy, Rodley
The Morley Academy, Morley
Mount St Mary's Catholic High School, Richmond Hill
Oulton Academy, Oulton
Prince Henry's Grammar School, Otley
Pudsey Grammar School, Pudsey
Ralph Thoresby School, Holt Park
The Rodillian Academy, Lofthouse
Roundhay School, Roundhay
The Ruth Gorse Academy, Morley
St Mary's Menston Catholic Voluntary Academy, Menston
Temple Learning Academy, Halton Moor
Temple Moor High School, Halton
Trinity Academy Leeds, Burmantofts
University Technical College Leeds, Hunslet
Wetherby High School, Wetherby
Woodkirk Academy, Tingley

Special and alternative schools 

Broomfield South SILC, Belle Isle
The Elland Academy, Garforth
Green Meadows Academy, Guiseley
John Jamieson School, Oakwood
Lighthouse School Leeds, Woodhouse
Penny Field School, Meanwood
Springwell Leeds Academy, Belle Isle
The Stephen Longfellow Academy, Beeston
West Oaks School, Boston Spa
West SILC, Stanningley

Further education
Elliott Hudson College
Leeds City College
Leeds College of Building
Notre Dame Catholic Sixth Form College

Independent schools

Primary and preparatory schools
The Froebelian School, Horsforth
Leeds Menorah School, Moortown
Moorlands School, Weetwood
Queenswood School, Morley
Richmond House School, Far Headingley

Senior and all-through schools
Al Kauthar Girls Academy, Chapel Allerton
Fulneck School, Fulneck
Gateways School, Harewood
Grammar School at Leeds, Alwoodley Gates
Woodhouse Grove School, Apperley Bridge

Special and alternative schools
Armley Grange School, Armley
Core Training and Development, Farnley
Fountain House Education Suite, Beeston
LS-TEN, Hunslet
The Pivot Academy LS East, Killingbeck
St John's Catholic School for the Deaf, Boston Spa
Southway, Belle Isle

Further education
SLP College

References

Leeds
Schools in Leeds
Schools
Schools